Kercha is one of the Aanaas in the Oromia of Ethiopia. It was part of former Bule Hora district. It is part of the Guji Zone.

Demographics 
The 2007 national census reported a total population for this woreda of 227,362, of whom 113,882 were men and 113,480 were women; 9,884 or 4.35% of its population were urban dwellers. The majority of the inhabitants said they were Protestant, with 58.37% of the population reporting they observed this belief, while 12.85% of the population practiced traditional beliefs, 4.95% practised Ethiopian Orthodox Christianity, 3.18% were Muslim, and 2.35% were Catholic.

Notes 

Districts of Oromia Region